Mullaley is a village in the Gunnedah Shire, New South Wales, Australia.

Geography 
Mullaley is on the Oxley Highway, 38 km west of Gunnedah. The Coxs Creek runs across the highway on the western side of the village. Mullaley is on the crossroads of the roads from Boggabri in the north, Premer in the south, Gunnedah in the east and Coonabarabran in the west. The surrounding area is part of the highly fertile Liverpool Plains region.

The Mullaley district has an agricultural community that produces wheat, other grains, fat lambs and beef cattle.

History 
On 14 October 1999 a 40-minute storm dumped 76 mm of rain and hail on the Western Liverpool Plains region around Mullaley causing damage to dozens of farms. The heavy rain that fell caused localised flooding. Numerous homes were flooded as hail-clogged roof guttering overflowed.

At the 2016 census, Mullaley had a population of 154 people.

Heritage 
The Goolhi Graves on Old Goolhi Station, Mullaley have been placed on the Register of the National Estate.

Amenities 
Mullaley has a General Store located in the post office which also has a nursery and hobby supplies.

The village now has a public school, sports ground, roadhouse, hotel, bus service, store, park and a stone war memorial with an honour roll.

References

External links

Towns in New South Wales
Gunnedah Shire